Néstor Fabián Silva (born January 17, 1982 in Tacuarembó) is a Uruguayan football forward.

Titles

References

1982 births
Living people
People from Tacuarembó
Uruguayan footballers
Uruguayan expatriate footballers
Tacuarembó F.C. players
C.A. Progreso players
Liverpool F.C. (Montevideo) players
Millonarios F.C. players
C.D. Olimpia players
Danubio F.C. players
Racing Club de Montevideo players
Juventud de Las Piedras players
Anagennisi Karditsa F.C. players
Uruguayan Primera División players
Uruguayan Segunda División players
Categoría Primera A players
Liga Nacional de Fútbol Profesional de Honduras players
Football League (Greece) players
Uruguayan expatriate sportspeople in Colombia
Uruguayan expatriate sportspeople in Honduras
Uruguayan expatriate sportspeople in Greece
Expatriate footballers in Colombia
Expatriate footballers in Honduras
Expatriate footballers in Greece
Association football forwards